Anne Dauphinais (born 1960) is an American politician. She is a Republican currently serving Connecticut House of Representatives District 44, comprising the towns of Killingly, Plainfield, and Sterling. Dauphinais grew up in Killingly and graduated from the Northern Maine Vocational Technical Institute and from Eastern Connecticut State University. She worked in nursing, sales, and for the Connecticut Department of Correction before being elected to the House in 2016, 2018 and 2020. Beginning in 2019, Dauphinais was a prominent leader opposing vaccine legislation in Connecticut and later protesting public safety measures put in place to curb the spread of the COVID-19 pandemic.

Early life and career
Dauphinais was born in 1960 and grew up in Killingly. She attended Eastern Connecticut State University where she received a Bachelor of Arts in sociology, and she graduated from Northern Maine Vocational Technical Institution's nursing program in 1986.

Dauphinais worked as a nurse, as a pre-release case manager for the Connecticut Department of Correction, and as a sales consultant for Novartis.

Political career
Dauphinais first ran for the House District 44 seat in 2016. She defeated incumbent Democrat Christine Rosati Randall 60%-40%. She faced Randall again in both 2018 and 2020 and won with very similar margins. In 2022, she defeated Randall's husband, David, again by a similar margin. 

She is a member of the Connecticut General Assembly Conservative Caucus.

Opposition to COVID measures

On September 2, 2020, the Connecticut House Republican caucus gathered at a press conference at the Connecticut state capitol to express opposition to Governor Ned Lamont's emergency COVID-19 orders. Dauphinais was the only caucus member to appear without a face mask. She told reporters that she "believes wearing a mask should be voluntary" and was doubtful of their effectiveness against preventing the spread of COVID-19.

Dauphinais organized and spoke at a rally the next day where participants called for an end to Lamont's emergency orders. The event drew around 100 participants.

Vaccine exemptions
Dauphinais was a leader of the opposition to HB #6423, a 2021 bill that sought to eliminate religious exemptions to childhood vaccinations for children attending school in Connecticut. In March 2019, she helped bring prominent anti-vaccine activist Robert F. Kennedy Jr. to a rally at the Connecticut State House where he presented information questioning the safety and efficacy of vaccines. In April 2019, Dauphinais helped collect signatures for a letter to Connecticut Attorney General William Tong claiming the new vaccine law would be a violation of citizens' rights. She also joined four legislative colleagues on a July 30, 2019 letter to Connecticut Department of Public Health Commissioner Renee Coleman-Mitchell urging her not to take a stand on the issue. The letter claimed that the bill in question was "a question of constitutional and civil rights law" and that it was therefore not in the purview of the Department of Public Health to support it.

Dauphinais also spoke at a 2021 rally against the vaccine bill prior to its consideration in the House.

Personal life
Dauphinais has four children, including a daughter she describes as a "special needs adult," and four grandchildren. She enjoys gardening, traveling and skiing. Her husband is chairman of a Quiet Corner chapter of the Tea Party movement.

Electoral history

References

External links

Anne Dauphinais at Vote Smart

1960 births
Living people
Republican Party members of the Connecticut House of Representatives
21st-century American politicians